Conati is an Italian surname. Notable people with the surname include:

Cristina Conati, Italian and Canadian computer scientist
Gianfranco Conati, Italian soldier in World War II, captain of 8th Paratroopers Engineers Regiment (Italy)
Luciano Conati (1950–2016), Italian cyclist

Italian-language surnames